Juan Miguel Rossell Milanes (born December 28, 1969 in Jiguani, Granma) is a beach volleyball player from Cuba, who won the gold medal in the men's beach team competition at the 2003 Pan American Games in Santo Domingo, Dominican Republic, partnering Francisco Alvarez. He represented his native country at the 1996 and the 2004 Summer Olympics.

References
 Profile at the Beach Volleyball Database

1969 births
Living people
Cuban beach volleyball players
Men's beach volleyball players
Beach volleyball players at the 1996 Summer Olympics
Beach volleyball players at the 2004 Summer Olympics
Olympic beach volleyball players of Cuba
Beach volleyball players at the 2003 Pan American Games
Pan American Games gold medalists for Cuba
Pan American Games medalists in volleyball
Medalists at the 2003 Pan American Games